Mifta al-Usta Umar (1935–22 March 2010) was the General Secretary of Libya's General People's Congress from 15 February 1984 to 7 October 1990. In this role, he was officially Libya's head of state, though Muammar Gaddafi continued to exercise ultimate authority in Libya as "Leader and Guide of the Revolution".

He graduated from the Faculty of Medicine at Ain Shams University in Cairo in 1961. He worked as a physician at Massa Hospital in Al-Bayda and, in 1963, became General Manager of the hospital

References

1935 births
2010 deaths
Heads of state of Libya
Secretaries-General of the General People's Congress
Health ministers of Libya